The Rashtriya Lok Janata Dal (abbr. RLJD) is an Indian political party formally announced by Upendra Kushwaha on 20 February 2023, in Bihar after resignation from Janata Dal (United). The party's ideology is based on the ideals of Karpoori Thakur.

References

Political parties in India
Political parties in Bihar
National political parties in India
Socialist parties in India
 
Political parties established in 2023
Politics of Bihar
Janata Parivar
2023 establishments in Bihar